Dirty Creek is a stream in Muskogee County and McIntosh County, Oklahoma in the United States.

Dirty Creek is a corruption of Terre D'Inde, a Muscogee-language name meaning "land of the turkey".

See also
List of rivers of Oklahoma

References

Rivers of McIntosh County, Oklahoma
Rivers of Muskogee County, Oklahoma
Rivers of Oklahoma